Armine von Tempski (or Tempsky) (1892, Maui, Hawaiian Islands – December 2, 1943, Fresno, California) was an American writer  and one of Hawaii's best known authors.  She was a granddaughter of Gustavus von Tempsky.

Armine Von Tempski's autobiographies and novels were based on her early life among the paniolos (cowboys) on the Haleakala cattle ranch  atop the Haleakalā shield volcano.  The Haleakala Ranch, which Jack London first visited in 1907,   was his favourite  of the Hawaiian ranches he enjoyed on several extended visits with his wife Charmian.  The young Armine, then sixteen years old,   asked London to read some of her stories and give his opinion.  He said that they were "clumsy, incoherent tripe" but added that "every so often there's a streak of fire on your pages,"  which encouraged her.

Her first published writing, in the early 1920s,  was about efforts to restore the island of Kahoolawe after years of drought and overgrazing.

Personal life 
She married California real estate agent  Alfred Lathrop Ball on December 25, 1932, in Ventura County, California.   They were friends of poet Don Blanding,  who illustrated von Tempski's book, Ripe Breadfruit (New York: Dodd, Mead and Company, 1935).

Note:  While Von Tempski's year of birth is sometimes given or presumed as 1899, most source texts place it in 1892.

Bibliography
The Ox Bow Press in Woodbridge, Connecticut, publishes reprint editions of von Tempski's books.

Autobiographies 

 1940.  Born in Paradise.  (Bestseller.)   Paperback: .
 1946.  Aloha. (Sequel)  Paperback: .  Hardcover: .

Fiction 

 1927.  Hula. Hardcover:  (the 1927 silent film Hula was based on it)
 1928.   Hardcover: .
 1929.  
 1933.   (Fictional account of the pineapple industry's beginnings on Maui)  Hardcover: .
 1935. 
 1940.  (For younger readers.)  
 1941. 
 1942.  Hardcover: .
 1946.

References

External links
 
 

1892 births
People from Maui
Novelists from Hawaii
20th-century American novelists
American women novelists
American autobiographers
1943 deaths
Women autobiographers
20th-century American women writers
American people of German descent
American women non-fiction writers
20th-century American non-fiction writers